Yomary Cruz is an American actress and news personality known as the voice of  from the comic science fiction machinima video series Red vs. Blue.  She has also anchored / reported for WFOR-TV in Miami and for the KTLA Morning News in Los Angeles.

Filmography

References

American film actresses
American voice actresses
Year of birth missing (living people)
Living people
Rooster Teeth people
21st-century American screenwriters
21st-century American actresses